Girls Will Be Girls is the second album by  R&B group Klymaxx. Released in 1982, Produced by Jimmy Jam and Terry Lewis and Lakeside members Otis Stokes and Stephen Shockley with Dynasty member William Shelby. This  would be one of the first acts Jimmy Jam and Terry Lewis would begin their writing and production career outside of The Time.

Track listing
"Girls Will Be Girls" (Otis Stokes) - 6:09  	
"Wild Girls" (Terry Lewis, James Harris) - 6:01
"Convince Me" (Lynn Malsby, Stephen Shockley, Lorena Stewart) - 5:15
"The Man in My Life" (Dana Meyers, Dwight T. Smith, Joyce Irby) - 5:27
"Heartbreaker (I'm Such a Mess)" (Bernadette Cooper, Cheryl Cooley) - 4:27
"All Turned Out" (Bernadette Cooper, Ernest "Pepper" Reed, Joyce Irby, Judy Takeuchi, Lynn Malsby) - 4:54
"Offer I Can't Refuse"	(Stephen Shockley) - 4:51
"If You Love Me" (Otis Stokes) - 5:11
"Don't Hide Your Love" (William Shelby, Lorena Stewart) - 4:11

Personnel
 Lorena Porter Hardimon – lead and backing vocals 
 Lynn Malsby – keyboards, backing vocals
 Robbin Grider – keyboards, guitar, backing vocals
 Cheryl Cooley – guitar, backing vocals
 M. Ann Williams – guitar 
 Joyce "Fenderella" Irby – bass, backing vocals 
 Bernadette Cooper – drums, percussion, backing vocals
 Judy Takeuchi – percussion, backing vocals

Arrangement Credits
 Klymaxx – rhythm and vocal arrangements 
 Jimmy Jam – rhythm and vocal arrangements 
 Terry Lewis – rhythm and vocal arrangements 
 Dana Myers – vocal arrangements 
 Earnest Reed – rhythm arrangements 
 William Shelby – rhythm and vocal arrangements 
 Stephen Shockley – rhythm and vocal arrangements 
 Otis Stokes – rhythm and vocal arrangements 
 Benjamin Wright – string arrangements 
 Janice Gower – string contractor

Production
 Otis Stokes – producer (1, 8)
 Jimmy Jam – producer (2, 4, 5, 6)
 Terry Lewis – producer (2, 4, 5, 6)
 Stephen Shockley – producer (3, 7)
 Joyce "Fenderella" Irby – co-producer (4)
 Bernadette Cooper – co-producer (5)
 William Shelby – producer (10)
 Dick Gafferty – executive producer
 Robert Brown – engineer
 Steve Hodge – engineer, mixing 
 Taavi Mote – engineer, mixing 
 Jim Shifflett – engineer
 Steve Williams – engineer
 Judy Clapp – assistant engineer
 David Egerton – assistant engineer
 Mishel Persley – assistant engineer
 Wally Traugott – mastering 
 Dina Andrews – production direction 
 Ron Coro – art direction 
 Kristen Kassell Nikosey – art direction, design
 Randee St. Nicholas – photography 
 Studios
 Recorded at Studio Masters (Los Angeles, California).
 Mixed at Larrabee Sound Studios (Hollywood, California).
 Mastered at Capitol Studios (Hollywood, California).

References

External links
Girls Will Be Girls at Discogs

1982 albums
Klymaxx albums
Albums produced by Jimmy Jam and Terry Lewis
SOLAR Records albums